Kotoryū Hiroo (born 2 March 1972 as Katsumi Nakano) is a former sumo wrestler from Hyōgo, Japan. He joined professional sumo in 1987, reaching the top division in 1996. He defeated yokozuna three times and earned one Fighting Spirit Prize. His highest rank was maegashira 1.

Career
He was born in Takasago, Hyōgo Prefecture, but moved to Ichikawa, Chiba Prefecture as a child. Kotoryū made his professional debut in March 1987 at the age of 15, joining Sadogatake stable. At the beginning of his career he used the shikona Kotonakano, switching to Kotoryū in March 1993. He was first promoted to sekitori status in July 1994 upon promotion to the second highest jūryō division but could only last one tournament there. He returned to jūryō in May 1995 and made his debut in the top makuuchi division in July 1996.

Kotoryū was ranked in the top division for 51 tournaments over a period of nine years, earning three kinboshi, or gold stars, for defeating yokozuna. He also received one sanshō for Fighting Spirit. He was a regular in the upper maegashira ranks but he was never able to earn promotion to san'yaku. He came back from a number of injuries that sent him down to the jūryō division, winning the only yūshō or tournament championship of his career in that division March 2002 with a 12–3 record which earned him promotion back to makuuchi. He finally retired in May 2005 at the age of 33. At his retirement press conference he said the most memorable bout of his career was his upset of yokozuna Musashimaru in January 2000.

Fighting style
Kotoryū used both tsuki/oshi (pushing and thrusting) and yotsu (grappling) techniques. His preferred grip on the mawashi was hidari-yotsu, with his right hand outside and left hand inside his opponent's arms. Among his favourite kimarite were uwatenage (overarm throw) and tsuridashi (the lift out). However, he most often won with yori-kiri (the force out).

Retirement from sumo
After retirement Kotoryū stayed on as a coach at his stable for a short time under his fighting name, but he was unable to acquire  permanent toshiyori, or elder status and so left the sumo world in April 2006, to help with his father's business.

Career record

See also
List of sumo tournament second division champions
Glossary of sumo terms
List of past sumo wrestlers

References

External links

1972 births
Living people
Japanese sumo wrestlers
Sumo people from Hyōgo Prefecture
People from Ichikawa, Chiba
Sadogatake stable sumo wrestlers